Jennifer Schomaker is an American chemist who is a professor at the University of Wisconsin–Madison. Her research considers the total synthesis of natural and unnatural products. She was selected as an American Chemical Society Arthur C. Cope Scholar Awardee in 2021.

Early life and education 
Schomaker grew up in Michigan. She was an undergraduate student in chemistry at Saginaw Valley State University. During her studies she worked at the Dow Chemical Company, where she developed biocatalytic methods. She moved to Central Michigan University, where she completed a master's degree under the supervision of Thomas Delia. Her master's research involved the synthesis of aniline derivatives of trihalopyrimidines. She completed her master's research whilst raising two young daughters. After graduating, Schomaker moved to Michigan State University, where she joined the research group of Babak Borhan. For her doctorate she studied the synthesis of (+)-tanikolide and haterumalide NA.

Research and career 
Schomaker moved to the University of California, Berkeley as a postdoctoral researcher with Robert G. Bergman. Her postdoctoral research identified new modes of reactivity in cobalt dinitrosoalkane complexes.

In 2009, Schomaker joined the faculty at the University of Wisconsin–Madison. Her initial research involved densely functionalized, stereochemically complex amine-containing natural products. At [UW–Madison, Schomaker focused on the synthesis of natural and unnatural products, as well as the design of catalysts for tunable, chemo-, regio-, and enantioselective C-H amination reactions.

Awards and honors 
 2013 Sloan Research Fellow
 2013 National Science Foundation CAREER Award
 2013 Michigan State University Distinguished Alumni Lecturer
 2013 Journal of Physical Organic Chemistry Early Excellence Profile
 2014 American Chemical Society Women's Chemists Committee Rising Star Award
 2015 Michigan State University Recent Alumni Award
 2016 Kavli Fellow
 2019 University of California, Berkeley Somojai Miller Visiting Professor
 2021 Arthur C. Cope Scholar Award

Selected publications

References 

Living people
American women academics
American women chemists
Year of birth missing (living people)
Michigan State University alumni
Central Michigan University alumni
Saginaw Valley State University alumni
University of California, Berkeley faculty
University of Wisconsin–Madison faculty
21st-century American women
Organic chemists